XHBL-FM is a radio station on 91.9 FM in Culiacán, Sinaloa, Mexico. The station is owned by Radio TV México and carries La Ke Buena national grupera format.

History

XEBL was the first radio station in Sinaloa. It came to air on March 16, 1936. While Ignacio L. Sais obtained the concession for the station, originally on 1920, it was Enrique Maximiliano Gómez Blanco who founded and would later own XEBL.

In the 1960s, XEBL expanded into television with the launch of XHBL-TV channel 13, also owned by Gómez Blanco. It was part of the Tele-Cadena Mexicana network. When TCM's stations were seized in 1975, XHBL fell into legal limbo, and its fate after 1975 is unknown.

In 1994, XEBL became a combo AM/FM station with the sign-on of XHBL-FM 91.9. The station surrendered its AM frequency to the Federal Telecommunications Institute on August 21, 2018.

References

Radio stations in Sinaloa
Radio stations established in 1936